All India Mahila Congress (AIMC), also referred to as Mahila Congress, is the women's wing of the Indian National Congress (INC). The most recent President was Sushmita Dev who left office in 2021. Currently Netta D'Souza heads the All India Mahila Congress as its acting president appointed on 17 August 2021 by  former Congress Party President Sonia Gandhi.

History

An early high point for the organisation was a conference held in Bangalore in mid-1984 attended by Indira Gandhi, Rajiv Gandhi, and 30,000 delegates.

Organisation 
The All India Mahila Congress (AIMC) is split into regional branches designated as Pradesh Mahila Congress (State Women's Congress) which represents the AIMC in the states and union territories of India. The AIMC consists of the card–holding women members of the Indian National Congress which elects the executive committee and state president of each of the PMCCs.

List of presidents

General Secretary
In October 2015 Nagma, who was previously a film actress, was appointed to the office General Secretary.  In January 2019 INC president Rahul Gandhi appointed Apsara Reddy as National General Secretary, Reddy being noted as the first transgender office holder in the AIMC.

In March 2020, Aiyshwarya Mahadev was appointed its National Secretary.

In August 2021, Netta D'Souza was appointed its National President.

See also

 Indian Youth Congress
 National Students' Union of India

References

External links
 Official website

 
Women's wings of political parties in India
1984 establishments in India